Eriogonum argophyllum is a species of wild buckwheat known by the common names Sulphur Hot Springs buckwheat, Silver Lake buckwheat, and Ruby Valley buckwheat. It is endemic to Nevada in the United States, where there is only one known population.

This rare plant is a mat-forming perennial herb growing just a few centimeters tall. It is covered in gray woolly fibers. It produces erect stems a few centimeters tall topped with rounded inflorescences no more than a centimeter wide. The flowers are yellow. Flowering occurs in June and July, sometimes until September.

This plant only grows in the Ruby Valley of Elko County, Nevada. It grows in the wetlands associated with hot springs, and depends on the water for survival. It grows in shallow, sandy soils covered in a crust of minerals left by the evaporation of the water. Associated plants include Senecio canus, Ivesia kingii, Bromus tectorum, Centaurium exaltatum, and Ericameria nauseosa.

As with other species of buckwheats, E. argophyllum has small, aggregated, open flowers that are readily accessible to being visited by a large assortment of insects. Pollinators include bees in the family Halictidae, wasps in the families Sphecidae and Pompilidae, and flies in the families Syrphidae, Stratiomyidae, and Tachinidae. Flies and wasps in these families are the most frequent and common pollinator.

This species was a candidate for federal protection because its single population was considered threatened by geothermal development, livestock, and off-road vehicle use. These threats have been eliminated and the plant is no longer a candidate. The species is protected by the state of Nevada. A fence is in place around the population to keep out livestock and vehicles.

References

External links
USDA Plants Profile for Eriogonum argophyllum

argophyllum
Endemic flora of the United States
Flora of Nevada
Flora of the Great Basin
Elko County, Nevada
Plants described in 1972
Critically endangered flora of the United States